Clifford Winston is an applied microeconomist and senior fellow in the Economic Studies program at the Brookings Institution. He studies microeconomic policy and its impact on government performance, specializing in industrial organization, regulation, and transportation.

Education and career
Winston received his A.B. in economics from the University of California at Berkeley in 1974, his MSc from the London School of Economics in 1975, and his Ph.D. in economics from U.C. Berkeley in 1979.

Prior to joining Brookings, Winston was an associate professor in the Transportation Systems Division of the Massachusetts Institute of Technology’s Department of Civil Engineering. Teaching at both the undergraduate and graduate levels, Winston’s courses included Applied Microeconomic Theory, Advanced Travel Demand Analysis, Applied Econometrics, Public Policy Toward Industry, and Transportation Economics. He also lectured on microeconomic policies at Australian National University and served as a visiting professor at the Institut d'Études Politiques de Paris (Sciences Po), where he taught competition policy.

Winston began working at the Brookings Institution in 1984 as a research associate; he has been a senior fellow since 1986. From 1987 to 1998, Winston was co-editor of the Brookings Papers on Economic Activity: Microeconomics, which publishes innovative analyses on real-word institutions and economic policy with an empirical focus and a pragmatic aim.

First Thing We Do, Let's Deregulate All the Lawyers
First Thing We Do, Let’s Deregulate All the Lawyers (Brookings Press, 2011) is the latest book from Clifford Winston, Robert W. Crandall, and Vikram Maheshri. It analyzes why legal costs are so high and proposes how they can be reduced without sacrificing the quality of legal services. They argue that deregulating entry by individuals and firms into the legal profession will inherently improve lawyers’ performance, as they contend for business in a more competitive environment.

"This is a sobering, intelligent, controversial examination of the role lawyers play in the national economy. Although I disagree with some of the authors’ assumptions and conclusions, the brilliance of their analyses cannot be disputed."—Thomas A. Mesereau, Jr., Partner, Mesereau & Yu, LLP, Los Angeles; the lawyer who won the Michael Jackson criminal case

Published works

Books 
 First Thing We Do, Let’s Deregulate All the Lawyers. Washington, DC: The Brookings Institution Press, 2011.
 Last Exit: Privatization and Deregulation of the U.S. Transportation Industry. Washington, DC: The Brookings Institution Press, 2010.
 Aviation Infrastructure Performance: A Study in Comparative Political Economy. Washington, DC: The Brookings Institution, 2008 (co-edited with Gines de Rus).
 Government Failure Versus Market Failure: Microeconomics Policy Research and Government Performance. Washington, DC: The Brookings Institution Press and AEI, 2006.
 Deregulation of Network Industries: What’s Next? Washington, DC: The Brookings Institution Press and AEI, 2006.

Selected academic articles

Selected op-eds

References

External links 
 The Brookings Institution
 The Brookings Institution Press
 Brookings Expert Page
 

Year of birth missing (living people)
Living people
Microeconomists
American economists
UC Berkeley College of Letters and Science alumni
Alumni of the London School of Economics